The Smithwick Formation is a geologic formation in Texas. It preserves fossils dating back to the Carboniferous period.

See also

 List of fossiliferous stratigraphic units in Texas
 Paleontology in Texas

References
 

Carboniferous geology of Texas
Carboniferous southern paleotropical deposits